The Sunshine Kids Foundation is a non-profit organization established in Houston, Texas in 1982 that provides a variety of free programs and events for children who are receiving cancer treatments in hospitals across the United States and North America.

Since 2001, the executive director of the Sunshine Kids Foundation has been actor G.W. Bailey, who has volunteered with the group for over fifteen years since being introduced to the organization by his goddaughter, who was diagnosed with leukemia in 1982.

In 2004, the group had a total revenue of over $1.9 million, and spent nearly $1.3 million on program expenses.

The best-known supporters of The Sunshine Kids are Bailey and retired Houston Astros legend Craig Biggio, who has been the organization's national spokesperson for more than 10 years. He wore a Sunshine Kids pin on his hat during Spring Training for over 15 years, the majority of his career. It also appeared on his '3000 hits' banner when he reached the historic milestone during his final season.

References
"The Sunshine Kids" (Available: 30 January 2006) 
"Charity Navigator Rating - The Sunshine Kids Foundation" (Available: 30 January 2006)

External links
Official web site of The Sunshine Kids

Children's charities based in the United States
Cancer charities in the United States
Charities based in Texas
Medical and health organizations based in Texas